Bo Hamburger (born 24 May 1970 in Frederiksberg) is a Danish former professional road racing cyclist. He retired in 2006.

Biography
After ending his career, Hamburger started a building company and a bike shop.

Doping
He was fired from Team CSC in 2001, after a positive EPO test. He was later cleared legally since the B test was below the limit, but still higher than normal. Since then, the Danish Cycle Union refused to let Hamburger represent Denmark. Hamburger fought the exclusion through legal means.

In his book Den største pris – en cykelrytters bekendelser (The Greatest Cost – Confession of a Cyclist) released in Denmark on 7 November 2007, he admitted to using EPO and human growth hormone from 1995 to 1997.

His name was also on the list of doping tests published by the French Senate on 24 July 2013 that were collected during the 1998 Tour de France and found positive for EPO when retested in 2004.

Major results 

1991
 5th Overall Tour of Sweden
1992
 2nd Overall Tour of Sweden
 4th Coppa Sabatini
 8th Giro di Lombardia
 8th Gran Piemonte
 10th Overall Vuelta a Andalucía
1993
 2nd Overall Hofbrau Cup
 3rd Overall Tour de l'Avenir
 4th Coppa Placci
 8th Grand Prix de Wallonie
 8th Classique des Alpes
 9th Brabantse Pijl
 9th Druivenkoers-Overijse
1994
 1st Stage 8 Tour de France
 3rd Wincanton Classic
 3rd Grand Prix Herning
 4th Overall Vuelta a Andalucía
 5th Veenendaal–Veenendaal
 8th Coppa Placci
 9th Gran Piemonte
1995
 2nd Overall Danmark Rundt
 2nd Grand Prix Herning
 5th Overall Volta a Catalunya
1996
 2nd Road race, National Road Championships
 2nd Grand Prix de Wallonie
 6th Overall Volta a Catalunya
 6th Overall Tour de Luxembourg
 8th Overall Danmark Rundt
 10th Classique des Alpes
1997
 2nd  Road race, UCI Road World Championships
 4th Overall Grand Prix du Midi Libre
 7th Overall Volta a Catalunya
1998
 1st La Flèche Wallonne
 1st Stage 2 Tour of the Basque Country
 2nd Overall Volta a la Comunitat Valenciana
1st Stage 2
 2nd Overall Tour Méditerranéen
 2nd Road race, National Road Championships
 3rd Overall Critérium International
 4th Overall Danmark Rundt
 4th GP de Fourmies
 5th Amstel Gold Race
 5th Gran Premio Bruno Beghelli
 6th Classique des Alpes
 9th Giro di Romagna
 Tour de France
Held  After Stage 4
1999
 6th Overall Settimana Internazionale di Coppi e Bartali
 7th Overall Tirreno–Adriatico
2000
 1st  Road race, National Road Championships
 1st Stage 4 Paris–Nice
 3rd Paris–Bourges
 3rd GP de Fourmies
 6th Overall Rheinland-Pfalz Rundfahrt
1st Stage 4
 6th Tour du Haut Var
 8th GP Ouest–France
 9th Rund um den Flughafen Köln–Bonn
2001
 6th Overall Giro della Liguria
2002
 2nd GP Fred Mengoni
 3rd Road race, National Road Championships
 10th Coppa Ugo Agostoni
2003
 2nd GP Industria & Commercio di Prato
 2nd GP Fred Mengoni
 3rd Road race, National Road Championships
 6th Road race, UCI Road World Championships
 7th Coppa Ugo Agostoni
 8th Trofeo Città di Castelfidardo
 9th Giro di Romagna
 9th Trofeo Pantalica
 10th Gran Premio Bruno Beghelli
2004
 1st Stage 2 Giro della Liguria
 2nd Giro delle Colline del Chianti
 5th GP Industria & Commercio di Prato
 6th Wachovia Invitational
2006
 5th Trofeo Matteotti

Grand Tour general classification results timeline

See also
 List of doping cases in cycling

References

External links 

Official Tour de France results for Bo Hamburger

1970 births
Living people
Danish male cyclists
Doping cases in cycling
Danish Tour de France stage winners
Cyclists at the 2004 Summer Olympics
Olympic cyclists of Denmark
Danish sportspeople in doping cases
Sportspeople from Frederiksberg